Walter Bernhard (born 24 April 1971) is a Swiss retired footballer who played in the 1990s and 2000s mainly as striker, but also as midfielder. 

Bernhard played his youth football with local club SV Muttenz and advanced to their first team for the 1990–91 season, in the fourth tier of Swiss football.
Bernhard then joined Basel's first team for their 1991–92 season under head-coach Ernst-August Künnecke. After playing in five test games Bernhard played his domestic league debut for the club in the away game on 6 August 1991 as Basel were defeated 1–4 by Urania Genève Sport. In his one season with the club Bernhard played a total of 13 games for Basel without scoring a goal. Three of these games were in the Nationalliga A and 10 were friendly games.

After his time with Basel, Bernhard moved on to play for FC Fribourg. He played with them during the 1992–93 season, appearing in 18 domestic league games scoring one goal. As his contract was not prolonged Bernhard returned to his club of origin and played amateur football. Bernhard ended his active playing career in 2005 having spent the previous three seasons with FC Breitenbach, also in the fourth tier of Swiss football.

During the 2006–07 season Bernhard was coach for SC Dornach's first team. Later he was also coach for various other local clubs.

References

Sources
 Die ersten 125 Jahre. Publisher: Josef Zindel im Friedrich Reinhardt Verlag, Basel. 
 Verein "Basler Fussballarchiv" Homepage

SV Muttenz players
FC Basel players
FC Fribourg players
Swiss men's footballers
Association football midfielders
Association football forwards
Swiss Challenge League players
1971 births
Living people
Footballers from Basel